Tropidomyrmex is a Neotropical genus of ants in the subfamily Myrmicinae. The genus contains the single species Tropidomyrmex elianae, known from Brazil.

References

External links

Myrmicinae
Monotypic ant genera
Hymenoptera of South America